Spencerville Public Schools is a school district in Northwest Ohio. The school district serves students who live in the village of Spencerville, located in Allen County. The superintendent is Cindy Endsley.

Grades 9-12
Spencerville High School

Grades 6-8
Spencerville Middle School

Grades 4-5
Spencerville Jennings Elementary School

Grades PK-3
Spencerville Elementary Schools

External links
District Website

School districts in Ohio
Education in Allen County, Ohio